SIGIR may refer to:
 Special Inspector General for Iraq Reconstruction
 Special Interest Group on Information Retrieval, a Special Interest Group (SIG) of the Association for Computing Machinery (ACM) concerned about information retrieval